The Settimana Internazionale di Coppi e Bartali, also known as Coppi e Bartali, is an Italian cycle road race. It is run typically in late March over five days in the Emilia-Romagna region of Italy.

History
Between 1999 and 2000 it was called Memorial Cecchi Gori while it was also previously held as Giro di Sardegna and Giro di Sicilia. The race is named after Italian cyclists Gino Bartali and Fausto Coppi.

Since 2005, the race has been organised as a 2.1 event on the UCI Europe Tour. It is considered one of the most important stage races in Italy and is organized by Gruppo Sportivo Emilia.

In 2004 the organization of the race retired the number 145, worn by Marco Pantani in 2003 when he placed tenth and finished second in one stage after Ruslan Ivanov, allowing him to stand on the podium for the last time in his life. At the start of the race a flock of white doves was also released to remember him.

In 2009 at the 24th edition of the race, Damiano Cunego was the overall victor after two stage wins and a second place on the last day.

Damiano Cunego won by 24 seconds over Cadel Evans in 2nd place and by 38 seconds over Massimo Giunti in 3rd place.

Both Damiano Cunego and Cadel Evans said this was an important part of their training lead up to both Giro d'Italia 2009 for Cunego and Tour de France 2009 for Cadel Evans.

List of winners

References

External links
 

 
Cycle races in Italy
UCI Europe Tour races
Recurring sporting events established in 1984
1984 establishments in Italy